Thomas William Stevenson Rowbotham (8 April 1949 – 8 November 2022), known professionally as Tom Owen, was a British actor best known for playing Tom Simmonite in the sitcom Last of the Summer Wine. He was the son of Bill Owen, who played William "Compo" Simmonite (the father of Tom Simmonite) in the show.

Theatre
Owen trained as a student assistant stage manager at Leatherhead Theatre in 1966. He worked extensively in repertory both as an actor and director. In 1969 Owen played Farley, in 'Goodbye, Mr. Chips' a role first played by John Mills in the original version. He was a member of the Royal Shakespeare Company playing on Broadway in their production of 'London Assurance'. His performance as Krapp in Fiona Baddeley's production of Beckett's masterpiece 'Krapp's Last Tape' was likened to those given by Michael Gambon, John Hurt and Harold Pinter. He has appeared in the West End in 'Lulu'. He also starred in over twenty pantomimes.

Television
Owen made his television debut in 1968 playing Bill Cowan in Southern TV's groundbreaking series Freewheelers appearing in fifty two episodes. Numerous television series followed including Tottering Towers (13 episodes), Wreckers at Deadeye, Horse in the House, The Piglet Files, The Hello Goodbye Man, Z Cars, Upstairs Downstairs, The Bill, Minder, and Our Mutual Friend.

Owen's debut in Last Of The Summer Wine was in 1991 as a bank customer at a cash dispenser in the episode "Situations Vacant". Following the death of his father, Bill, who played Compo in 184 episodes over twenty-seven years, Tom joined Last of the Summer Wine as a regular in 2000 and stayed with the show appearing in 93 episodes until it ended in 2010. 

Owen appeared with Kirk Douglas in the TV film Queenie, with Michael York in Great Expectations and David Hemmings in Unman, Wittering and Zigo.

Film
Owen starred in two films which were released in 2018: The Bromley Boys and The Guernsey Literary and Potato Peel Pie Society.

Personal life and death
Owen married Mary Bernadette Therese Moylan in 1978; they had two sons, James and William.

Owen died on 8 November 2022, at the age of 73.

Television roles

References

External links

1949 births
2022 deaths
British male comedy actors
English male television actors
Male actors from Brighton
20th-century English male actors
21st-century English male actors
English male stage actors
Male actors from London
People from Marylebone